Pankaj Arjan Advani (born 24 July 1985) is an Indian billiards and former professional snooker player. He is a 25-time International Billiards and Snooker Federation (IBSF) world champion. He has won 17 billiards world titles, the IBSF World Billiards Championship on 16 occasions and the World Team Billiards Championship once. In snooker, he won the IBSF World Snooker Championship three times, IBSF World six-red championship twice and the IBSF World Team Cup and IBSF World Team Championship one time each. He has the record number of IBSF world championships. He became a snooker professional in 2012/2013.

In recognition of his achievements, the Government of India has bestowed several awards upon Advani: the Arjuna Award in 2004, Major Dhyan Chand Khel Ratna in 2006, Padma Shri in 2009 and Padma Bhushan in 2018.

Early life
Pankaj Advani was born on 24 July 1985 to a Sindhi  family in Pune, India. Advani spent his initial years in Kuwait before moving to Bangalore, India. He received his education at the Frank Anthony Public School, Bangalore and completed his bachelor's degree in Commerce from Sri Bhagawan Mahaveer Jain College. He received training in snooker from former national Snooker champion Arvind Savur.

At the age of 10 his acumen for snooker came to the notice of Arvind Savur after being introduced to the sport by his elder brother Dr. Shree Advani, a noted Sport & Performance Psychologist. He won his first ever title at the age of 11 and went on to set several records at the state and national levels. In the year 2000 he won his first Indian Junior Billiards Championship title and then went on to win it again in 2001 and 2003. In 2003 he not only won the Indian Junior Snooker and Billiards Championship, he also won the senior snooker champions which made him the youngest National Snooker champion at age 17.

Billiards career

Advani made his international competitive debut in 1999 at the World Billiards Championship in England. After World Snooker Champion title win in 2003, he won the IBSF World Billiards Championship in 2005 at Qawra, Malta, where he became the first to achieve a "Grand Double" by winning both the time and point formats, making him the first cueist to achieve that feat. He has won the "Grand Double" on three occasions, 2008 in Bangalore, 2014 in England and 2018 in Myanmar. He is the only Indian to have won the amateur world title in both snooker and billiards.

Advani has the distinction of winning all five national, regional, and world billiards tournaments in a single season, a feat he achieved by winning the Indian Junior National Championship and Senior National Championship, the Asian Billiards Championship, and both the World Billiards Championship (point format) and World Billiards Championship (time format) in 2005.

In April 2012, Advani won the Asian Billiards Championship in Goa, India to become the first player to win 5 Asian Billiards Champion titles. It was announced in May that Advani had accepted the Indian wildcard place on the main snooker tour for the 2012–13 season.

In October 2012, in Leeds, England, Advani won his seventh (counting professional and amateur) World Billiards Championship title, eighth world title overall, beating defending and nine-time WPBSA World Billiards Champion Mike Russell again, in the timed division final (Advani did not make it to the points division final).

On 14 August 2014, Advani helped win the first ever World Team Billiards Championship held in Glasgow, Scotland, along with Rupesh Shan, Devendra Joshi and Ashok Shandilya.

On 2 February 2017, Pankaj Advani won his 29th National Championship Title at the PYC Hindu Gymkhana in Pune, India. This gave him a 39 match-winning streak. Overall, as of 2017 Advani had won 60 titles: 19 world titles; 8 Asian titles; 2 Asian Games titles; 1 Australian Open title and 30 national titles.

In 2018, Advani won his 7th Asian Billiards Title in Myanmar making him the maximum holder of the Asian Title. On March 11, 2020, won the 6 reds national snooker championship in Ahmedabad taking his total tally of national champions to 34. (11 junior and 23 senior).

Snooker career

Pankaj Advani, on international competitive debut in the discipline, won the IBSF World Snooker Championship (i.e. the World Amateur Snooker Championship) on 25 October 2003 in Jiangmen, China. He was 18 years old, and became the youngest Indian to win the title, his first world title. When he was 28-years-old, at the IBSF World 6-Red World Snooker Championship in Sharm-El-Sheik, Egypt, a feat he repeated in August 2015 after he successfully defended the title in Karachi, Pakistan.

As a new player on the tour, Advani would need to win four matches to reach the main stage of the ranking events. He did this in just his fourth attempt, when qualifying for the International Championship. He defeated Craig Steadman 6–1, six-time world champion Steve Davis 6–5 (after being 1–4 down), Alan McManus 6–3 and Michael Holt 6–4 to reach the venue stage for the first time. He made four s during qualification, the most of any player. Advani was to play a wildcard match once at the tournament in Chengdu, China, to reach the last 32, however he decided to withdraw from the tournament to take part in the World Billiards Championship, which he went on to win. He also reached the semi-finals of the minor ranking European Tour Event 1, beating four-time world champion John Higgins 4–1 along the way. Advani lost to Mark Selby 2–4. Advani played in eight of the ten of these Players Tour Championship events and finished 40th on the Order of Merit.

At the 2013 Welsh Open, he became the first Indian player to reach the quarter-final stage of a ranking event with a 4–1 win over Graeme Dott in the last 16, but lost 2–5 to Judd Trump. Advani's season ended when he was beaten 8–10 by Joe Swail in the first round of World Championship Qualifying. He was ranked world number 74 after his first year on the main snooker tour.

2013/2014
The 2013–14 season saw the introduction of a ranking event in Advani's home country of India for the first time which he qualified for by beating Matthew Selt 4–0. At the tournament in New Delhi Advani defeated Marcus Campbell 4–1 and Mark Allen 4–2. His match with Allen finished at 11 pm local time, with Advani back in last 16 action at 10 am the next morning to play Stuart Bingham. The match went to a deciding frame and when Bingham broke down on a break of 30, Advani stepped in to compose a match winning 86. Advani played compatriot Aditya Mehta in the quarter-finals in an iconic match in Indian snooker as the winner would be the country's first ranking event semi-finalist. The match was heavily focused on safety and it was Mehta who advanced with a 4–3 win. His best run in a ranking event during the rest of the season was at the World Open, where he narrowly beat Xiao Guodong 5–4 to set up a last 32 meeting with Ding Junhui. Advani had a lead of 4–2 in the best of nine frame match and was 35 points to 0 ahead in the seventh frame to be on the cusp of a shock result against the player who had already won four ranking events this season. However, Ding made a break of 52 to win the frame, compiled a 136 to draw level and won the deciding frame in one visit to defeat Advani. Advani's successful season saw him finish inside the top 64 in the world rankings for the first time as he was placed 56th.

2014/2015 
Advani didn't enter any tournaments until September 2014, when he announced that he was relinquishing his snooker tour card to concentrate on his billiards career and spend more time with his family. He received an invite to participate in the wildcard round of the 2015 Indian Open, but lost 4–3 to Rhys Clark.

2015/2016  
In May 2016 he won the Asian 6-Red Snooker title. He became the first player in the world to hold the world title as well as the continental title at the same time after he beat Malaysian Keen Hoh Moh 7–5. In the same tournament, Advani sailed to the semi-finals of the World Amateur Snooker Championship where he lost to Thailand's Kritsanut Lertsattayathorn.

2016/2017  
Advani received an entry in to the wildcard round of the Indian Open and he beat Fang Xiongman 4–2 and Elliot Slessor 4–0, before losing 4–3 to Stephen Maguire in the third round. He won all of his group matches at the Six-red World Championship and then eliminated Lukas Kleckers 6–0 and Yuan Sijun 6–4. Michael Holt withdrew from the event which moved Advani straight in to the semi-finals, where he was defeated 7–4 by Ding Junhui.

Performance and rankings timeline of professional snooker

Titles
World Titles – 25

Billiards

IBSF World Billiards Championship (Point Format) – 8 (2005, 2008, 2014, 2016, 2017, 2018, 2019, 2022)

IBSF World Billiards Championship (Long Format) – 8 (2005,2007, 2008, 2009, 2012, 2014, 2015, 2018)

World Team Billiards Championship – 1 (2014)

Snooker

IBSF World Snooker Championship (15 Reds) – 3 (2003, 2015, 2017)

IBSF World Snooker Championship (6 Reds) – 2 (2014, 2015)

IBSF 6-Red Snooker World Cup – 1 (2021)

IBSF World Team Cup – 1 (2018)

IBSF World Team Championship – 1 (2019)

Asian Games

2006 Asian Games, Doha - Gold Medal (English Billiards – Singles)

2010 Asian Games, Guangzhou – Gold Medal (English Billiards – Singles)

Asian Titles – 13

Billiards – 9 (2005, 2008, 2009, 2010, 2012, 2017, 2018, 2022, 2023)

Snooker – 4

Asian Snooker Title (6 Reds) – 2016

Asian Snooker Title (15 Reds) – 2019, 2021

Asian Team Snooker Title (2017)

National Championships - 34

Junior National Billiards – 7

Junior National Snooker – 4

Senior National Billiards – 10

Senior National Snooker (15 Reds) – 9

Senior National Snooker (6 Reds) – 4                            

English Billiards

World Billiards Championship (English billiards): 2012 , 2014

IBSF World Billiards Championship

Awards and honours
 Padma Bhushan, India's third highest civilian honour, 2018
 Major Dhyan Chand Khel Ratna, India's highest sporting honour, 2005–06
 Rajyotsava Prashasti, Karnataka's second highest civilian honour, 2007.
 Karnataka's "Kempegowda Award", 2007.
 Ekalavya Award, Karnataka's highest sporting honour, 2007
 Vision of India's "International Indian" Award, 2005.
 Senior Sportsperson of the Year, 2005
 The Sports Writers' Association of Bangalore Award, 2005
 The Bangalore University Sportsperson of the Year, 2005
 The Hero India Sports Award, 2004
 The Rajeev Gandhi Award, 2004
 The Arjuna Award, 2004
 The Indo-American Young Achiever's Award, 2003
 The Sports Star Sportsperson of the Year, 2003

References

External links

Pankaj Advani at worldsnooker.com
 
Pankaj Advani's bio at BilliardsForum

1985 births
Living people
Indian snooker players
Indian players of English billiards
Sindhi people
Recipients of the Khel Ratna Award
Sportspeople from Bangalore
Sportspeople from Pune
Recipients of the Padma Shri in sports
Recipients of the Arjuna Award
World champions in English billiards
Asian Games medalists in cue sports
Cue sports players at the 2002 Asian Games
Cue sports players at the 2006 Asian Games
Cue sports players at the 2010 Asian Games
Indian expatriates in Kuwait
Asian Games gold medalists for India
Medalists at the 2006 Asian Games
Medalists at the 2010 Asian Games
Cue sports players from Karnataka
Recipients of the Padma Bhushan in sports
Recipients of the Rajyotsava Award 2007
Competitors at the 2013 World Games
20th-century Indian people
21st-century Indian people